The Golden Light Sutra or , also known by the Old Uygur title Altun Yaruq, is a Buddhist text of the Mahayana branch of Buddhism. In Sanskrit, the full title is The Sovereign King of Sutras, the Sublime Golden Light.

History
The sutra was originally written in India in Sanskrit and was translated several times into Chinese by Dharmakṣema and others, and later translated into Tibetan and other languages. Johannes Nobel published Sanskrit and Tibetan editions of the text. The sutra is influential in East Asia.

The name of the sutra derives from the chapter called "The Confession of the Golden Drum", where the bodhisattva Ruchiraketu dreams of a great drum that radiates a sublime golden light, symbolizing the dharma or teachings of Gautama Buddha.

The Golden Light Sutra became one of the most important sutras in China and  Japan because of its fundamental message, which teaches that the Four Heavenly Kings protect the ruler who governs his country in the proper manner.

The sutra also expounds the vows of the goddesses Sarasvatī, Lakṣmī and Dṛḍhā to protect any bhikṣu who will uphold and teach the sutra.

Taken at face value, one might take the main theme of the sutra literally, which is the importance for leaders to be good examples for the kingdom. In Chapter Twelve, the sutra speaks in verse form about the disasters that befall a kingdom when its ruler does not uphold justice, and the benefits of kings who lead an exemplary life. In the Chapter on the Guardian Kings, the Four Guardian Kings have a dialogue with the Buddha, explaining in vivid detail all the benefits a kingdom will have if its ruler enshrines the essence of the sutra and offers daily praise. The sutra contains some elements of early tantra, in that in chapter two, the sutra describes four Buddhas who dwell in the four cardinal directions. These same four comprise later Buddhist mandalas in the same positions, such as the Womb Realm.

During the Sui dynasty in China, the monk Zhiyi of the Tiantai tradition initiated a ritual ceremony known as "Gōngfó Zhāitiān" (供佛齋天) or just "Zhāitiān" (齋天), meaning "Puja of Offering to the Buddhas and the Devas", according to the rites prescribed in the Golden Light Sutra. During the ceremony, offerings are made to the Buddhas as well as the twenty-four devas as a sign of respect. This ceremony has been carried down through tradition into modern times and is customarily performed in Chinese Buddhist temples on the 9th day of the 1st month of the Chinese calendar.

The sutra also gained esteem as a sutra for protecting the country in China, Korea and Japan, and often was read publicly to ward off threats. For example, its first reading in Japan was as a court ceremony during around 660 AD, when the Tang dynasty of China and Silla of Korea defeated the state of Baekje of Korea and were threatening Japan. In 741 Emperor Shōmu of Japan founded provincial monasteries for monks (国分寺) and nuns (国分尼寺) in each province. The official name of the monasteries was the Temple for Protection of the State by the Four Heavenly Kings Golden Light Sutra. The 20 monks who lived there recited the Sovereign Kings Golden Light Sutra on a fixed schedule to protect the country. As Buddhism evolved in Japan, the practice gradually fell out of use, and is no longer continued today.

Translations
The Golden Light Sutra has been translated into Chinese, Saka ("Khotanese"), Old Turkic, Old Uyghur, Tangut, Classical Tibetan, Mongolian, Manchu, Korean and Japanese.

Chinese
Three canonical Chinese translations have survived:
 Jin guangming jin T663 translated by Dharmakṣema (385-433)
 the synoptic Hebu jin guangming T664, by Baogui, written in 597
 Jin guangming zuisheng wang jin T665, by Yijing (635-713)
An extracanonical version, ascribed to Paramārtha (499-569) is extant in a Japanese manuscript.

Japanese
One of the earliest Japanese annotations was an 8th-century kunten translation of the Yijing Chinese translation housed in Saidaiji Temple.

In 1933, Izumi published the first complete Japanese translation directly from Sanskrit, followed by another translation by Ama a year later.

Western languages
In 1958, Nobel published a German translation, based on Yijing's Chinese text.
In 1970, Emmerick produced an English translation of the short, condensed Sanskrit version of the Sutra of Golden Light into English.

In Tibetan, there are three versions of the Sutra: the 21, 29, and 31 chapter versions. The 29 Chapter Version was probably the most popular in Tibet and Tibetan Buddhist regions.

In 2007, the Foundation for the Preservation of the Mahayana Tradition, Lama Zopa Rinpoche's Buddhist organization, produced a translation of the 21 chapter version of the Sutra, the most abbreviated and condensed version.

See also
 Humane King Sutra
 Lotus Sutra

References

Bibliography
 Bagchi, S. ed. (1967). Suvarṇaprabhāsasūtram, Darbhanga: The Mithila Institute. Digital Sanskrit Buddhist Canon. (NB: in Unicode)
 Gummer, Natalie D. (2012). Listening to the Dharmabhāṇaka: The Buddhist Preacher in and of the Sūtra of Utmost Golden Radiance, Journal of the American Academy of Religion 80 (1), 137-160.  
 Lee, Sumi (2017). Kingship as "Dharma-Protector": A Comparative Study of Wŏnhyo and Huizhao's Views on the "Golden Light Sutra", Journal of Korean Religions 8 (1), 93-129  
 Skjaervo, Prods O. (2004 ). This Most Excellent Shine of Gold, King of Kings of Sutras: The Khotanese Suvarnabhãsottamasutra. 2 vols. Cambridge,MA: Department of Near Eastern Languages and Civilizations, Harvard University
 Suzuki, T. (2003). Stupa Worship and Dharma Evaluation in the Suvarnaprabhasa, Journal of Indian and Buddhist Studies 51 (2), 996-1001
 Tyomkin E. (1995).  Unique Sanskrit Fragments of  the “Sutra of Golden Light” in the manuscript collection of St Petersburg Branch of the Institute of Oriental Studies, Russian Academy of Sciences, Manuscripta Orientalia. Vol. 1, (1), 29-38.

External links
 The Sutra of Golden Light: The 21 Chapter Version, published by the FPMT
 Roman transliteration of Sanskrit (Bagchi), chapter-wise, DSBC Project

Mahayana sutras
Vaipulya sutras
Four Heavenly Kings